Oblique muscle of eye may refer to:

 Inferior oblique muscle
 Superior oblique muscle